
Gmina Czarna is a rural gmina (administrative district) in Łańcut County, Subcarpathian Voivodeship, in south-eastern Poland.

Villages
Gmina Czarna contains the villages and settlements of Czarna, Dąbrówki, Krzemienica, Medynia Głogowska, Medynia Łańcucka, Pogwizdów, Wola Mała and Zalesie.

Neighbouring gminas
Gmina Czarna is bordered by the town of Łańcut and by the gminas of Białobrzegi, Krasne, Łańcut, Rakszawa, Sokołów Małopolski, Trzebownisko and Żołynia.

References

Polish official population figures 2006

Czarna
Łańcut County